Gustavo Hernandez Lopez (born June 27, 1989) is an American mixed martial artist who competes in the Bantamweight division. A professional since 2012, he has competed for the Ultimate Fighting Championship.

Background
Lopez was raised in Wapato, Washington, along with two brothers. As a freshman in 2004, Lopez started his wrestling career at Wapato High School after his friends “tricked” him into trying out for the team. Four seasons, three state appearances and two medals at Mat Classic initially led to a full athletic scholarship to Stanford University. Nevertheless, Gustavo didn't want to leave his recently-widowed mother and move to California, so he resorted to turn the offer down and attend local Yakima Valley College. While competing there, he qualified for the NJCAA tournament twice while earning an associate’s degree in business accounting. 

While in community college, Gustavo began training at Yakima MMA and after a friend asked Lopez to corner a fight and a fighter on the card dropped out on the day of the event, Lopez agreed to step in and knocked out his opponent in seven seconds. He won his next eight amateur fights, turning pro in 2009 after it became difficult to find challengers. During the same time period, he became a nationally ranked NAIA wrestler at 141 pounds and earned his bachelor's degree in finance at Menlo College in 2014.

Mixed martial arts career

Early career

Starting his professional career in 2012, Lopez started out with Cagesport, where he went 2–1, before fighting for Bellator MMA at Bellator 2014 Monster Energy Cup against Sean Cantor, who he beat by first round rear-naked choke.

After this, he signed with Combate Americas, where he would mostly fight for the next 4 years. During this run, he fought for the Bantamweight title 3 times, losing the first two times to John Castañeda and José Alday, before winning on the third time in a rematch against José Alday at Combate 33 via TKO in the first round. He then defended the title against Joey Ruquet at Combate 42 on August 23, 2019. He won the fight via KOing Ruquet in a first round.

Ultimate Fighting Championship
On June 11, 2020, news broke that Lopez had signed with the UFC and would be replacing Ray Borg on short notice against Merab Dvalishvili on June 13, 2020 at UFC on ESPN: Eye vs. Calvillo. However, Combate Americas' CEO Campbell McLaren claimed they were not given a right to match UFC's offer and Lopez is still under the contract matching period. However, the contract dispute was eventually sorted out and Lopez was allowed to join the UFC. He lost the bout via unanimous decision.

Lopez faced Anthony Birchak, replacing Felipe Colares, on November 7, 2020 at UFC on ESPN: Santos vs. Teixeira. He won the fight via a submission in round one.

Lopez faced Adrian Yanez on March 20, 2021 at UFC on ESPN 21. He lost the fight via knockout in round three.

Lopez faced Alateng Heili on September 18, 2021 at UFC Fight Night 192.  The fight ended up with a draw.

After the draw, it was announced that Lopez was no longer on the UFC roster.

Post UFC 
In his first bout after his UFC release, Lopez faced Filip Macek on December 30, 2022 at Oktagon 38 for the Interim OKMMA Bantamweight Championship, winning the bout and the title via guillotine choke at the end of the first round.

Championships and accomplishments
Oktagon MMA
 OKMMA Interim Bantamweight Championship (one time)
Combate Americas
 Combate Americas Bantamweight Championship (one time; former)
 One successful defense

Mixed martial arts record

|-
|Win
|align=center|13–6–1
|Filip Macek
|Submission (guillotine choke)
|OKTAGON 38
|
|align=center|1
|align=center|4:44
|Prague, Czech Republic
|
|-
|Draw
|align=center|12–6–1
|Alateng Heili
|Draw (unanimous)
|UFC Fight Night: Smith vs. Spann 
|
|align=center|3
|align=center|5:00
|Las Vegas, Nevada, United States
|  
|-
|Loss
|align=center|12–6
|Adrian Yanez
|KO (punch)
|UFC on ESPN: Brunson vs. Holland
|
|align=center|3
|align=center|0:27	
|Las Vegas, Nevada, United States
|
|-
| Win
| align=center| 12–5
| Anthony Birchak
|Submission (rear-naked choke)
|UFC on ESPN: Santos vs. Teixeira
|
|align=center|1
|align=center|2:43
|Las Vegas, Nevada, United States
|
|-
| Loss
| align=center| 11–5
| Merab Dvalishvili
|Decision (unanimous)
|UFC on ESPN: Eye vs. Calvillo
|
|align=center|3
|align=center|5:00
|Las Vegas, Nevada, United States
|
|-
| Win
| align=center| 11–4
| Joey Ruquet
|KO (punch)
| Combate 42
| 
| align=center| 1
| align=center| 1:45
| Lake Tahoe, Nevada, United States
| 
|-
| Win
| align=center| 10–4
| José Alday
| TKO (punches)
| Combate 33
| 
| align=center| 1
| align=center| 2:19
| Tucson, Arizona, United States
| 
|-
| Win
| align=center|9–4
| Vicente Marquez
| Submission (shoulder choke)
| Combate 29
| 
| align=center| 1
| align=center| 0:50
| Fresno, California, United States
|
|-
| Loss
| align=center|8–4
|José Alday
| Decision (split)
| Combate 24
| 
| align=center| 3
| align=center| 5:00
| Phoenix, Arizona, United States
|
|-
|Loss
|align=center|8–3
|Andre Ewell
|KO (punch)
|KOTC: Energetic Pursuit
|
|align=center|1
|align=center|4:44
|Ontario, California, United States
|
|-
| Win
| align=center|8–2
| Chris Dempsey
|Submission (armbar)
|ExciteFight: Conquest of the Cage
|
|align=center|1
|align=center|1:19
|Airway Heights, Washington, Washington
|
|-
| Win
| align=center|7–2
| Steve Swanson
|Submission (guillotine choke)
|Combate Americas 10
|
|align=center|1
|align=center|2:34
|Mexico City, Mexico
|
|-
| Loss
| align=center|6–2
| John Castañeda
| TKO (punches)
| Combate Americas 9: Empire Rising
| 
| align=center| 4
| align=center| 2:24
| Verona, New York, United States
|
|-
| Win
| align=center| 6–1
| Saul Elizondo
| TKO (punches)
|Combate 7
|
|align=center|2
|align=center|4:07
|Los Angeles, California, United States
| 
|-
| Win
| align=center| 5–1
| Joey Ruquet
| Submission (rear-naked choke)
| Combate Americas: Road to the Championship 2
|
|align=Center|2
|align=center|4:06
|Hollywood, California, United States
| 
|-
| Win
| align=center| 4–1
| Mauricio Diaz
| Decision (unanimous)
| Combate Americas: Road to the Championship 1
| 
| align=center| 3
| align=center| 5:00
| Las Vegas, Nevada, United States
| 
|-
| Win
| align=center| 3–1
| Sean Cantor
| Submission (rear-naked choke)
| Bellator 2014 Monster Energy Cup
|
|align=center|1
|align=center|4:39
|Whitney, Nevada, United States
| 
|-
| Win
| align=center| 2–1
| Dylan Atkinson
| TKO (punches)
| CageSport 25
| 
| align=center| 2
| align=center| 1:12
| Tacoma, Washington, United States
| 
|-
| Loss
| align=center| 1–1
| Kasey White
| Decision (unanimous)
| CageSport 24
| 
| align=center| 3
| align=center| 5:00
| Tacoma, Washington, United States
|
|-
| Win
| align=center| 1–0
| Jorey Taylor
| TKO (punches)
| CageSport 20
| 
| align=center| 1
| align=center| 1:47
| Tacoma, Washington, United States
|

See also 
 List of male mixed martial artists

References

External links 
  
  

Living people
1989 births
American male mixed martial artists
Bantamweight mixed martial artists
Mixed martial artists utilizing collegiate wrestling
Mixed martial artists utilizing Brazilian jiu-jitsu
Ultimate Fighting Championship male fighters
Mixed martial artists from Washington (state)
American practitioners of Brazilian jiu-jitsu
American male sport wrestlers
Amateur wrestlers
People from Wapato, Washington